Rémi Garsau (born 19 July 1984) is a water polo player from France. He was part of the French team at the 2016 Summer Olympics, where the team was eliminated in the group stage.

See also
 France men's Olympic water polo team records and statistics
 List of men's Olympic water polo tournament goalkeepers

References

External links
 

French male water polo players
Water polo goalkeepers
Living people
1984 births
Olympic water polo players of France
Water polo players at the 2016 Summer Olympics